Nicholas Edward Powell (born 23 March 1994) is an English professional footballer who plays as a midfielder or as a striker for EFL Championship club Stoke City.

He began his career at Crewe Alexandra, initially as a forward, making his debut at the age of 16. After impressing for Crewe Alexandra during the 2011–12 season, including scoring in their 2–0 victory in the League Two play-off Final, he moved to Manchester United in July 2012. Unable to break into the Manchester United first team, however, he went on loan to Wigan Athletic, Leicester City and Hull City before being released in June 2016. He joined Wigan Athletic in July 2016. He spent three seasons at the DW Stadium before joining Stoke City in June 2019. He has represented England at under-16, under-17, under-18, under-19 and under-21 levels.

Club career

Crewe Alexandra
Born in Crewe, Cheshire, Powell attended Sandbach School and started his career at home-town club Crewe Alexandra, joining their youth system as a five-year-old. He made his debut for Crewe on 19 August 2010, in a League Two game against Cheltenham Town, which ended in a 3–2 defeat at Whaddon Road. At the age of 16 he came on as a second-half substitute for Clayton Donaldson, becoming the second youngest player ever to appear for Crewe.

On 20 August 2011, after only being on the pitch for eight minutes, Powell was sent off for the first time in the 2–0 defeat to Shrewsbury Town, following a poor challenge on Terry Gornell. Powell scored his first senior goal in a 3–1 away win at AFC Wimbledon on 15 October 2011. In January 2012, Powell was awarded the Football League's Young Player of the Month Award for December. He scored his first brace against Gillingham in a 4–3 win on 10 March 2012. On 21 April 2012, he won every award at Crewe's end of season awards ceremony, becoming the first player to win all five, including Goal of the Season (for his 30-yard strike in the 4–3 win at Gillingham), Young Player of the Year and Player of the Year.

On 27 May 2012, Powell scored the most important goal of his career so far, a volley from outside the box into the top corner in the 2–0 victory over Cheltenham Town in the 2012 League Two play-off Final at Wembley Stadium, to win promotion to League One.

Manchester United
Powell joined Manchester United from Crewe Alexandra on 2 July 2012 in a deal reported to be worth up to £6 million, depending on future success and appearances. He was allocated the number 25 shirt that had been worn by Antonio Valencia, who took the number 7 shirt. It is also the same shirt number that he had worn at Crewe.

Powell played his first match for United on 21 July 2012 coming on as a second-half substitute in a pre-season friendly against Ajax Cape Town in South Africa. Four days later, he made his first start for Manchester United in a pre-season friendly match against Shanghai Shenhua. He made his Premier League debut against Wigan Athletic in a 4–0 win on 15 September 2012, coming on as a substitute for Ryan Giggs in the 71st minute, and scoring his first goal for United in the 82nd minute after receiving a pass from Javier Hernández.

On 2 September 2013, Powell joined Wigan Athletic on a season-long loan, following in the footsteps of fellow Manchester United player Tom Cleverley who had been on loan at the club. Powell then went on to score Wigan's first ever European goal, against NK Maribor on 3 October 2013, and later added the third goal in a 3–1 victory for his side. Powell then increased his European tally to three with a right-footed equaliser in Wigan's home tie against Rubin Kazan. On 15 December 2013, Powell scored an overhead kick in a 3–2 win over Bolton Wanderers. On 14 January 2014, Powell scored twice against Milton Keynes Dons in the FA Cup, overcoming the 1–0 deficit to help Wigan win 3–1.

Powell was given the number 22 for the 2014–15 season. He started the first game of the season in a League Cup match against Milton Keynes Dons which United lost 4–0. He was later substituted for James Wilson.

On 2 September, he was loaned to newly promoted Premier League team Leicester City for the rest of the season, with Tom Lawrence also making the move but on a permanent basis. On 1 November, Powell made his Leicester debut against West Bromwich Albion in the Premier League, coming on as a second-half substitute for Danny Drinkwater on 81 minutes in a 0–1 home defeat. On 27 December, it was reported that Leicester City had opted to terminate Powell's loan early due to the player showing a lack of commitment to training.

On 23 November 2015, Powell made his first appearance in 2015, playing 55 minutes in an under-21 game against Norwich City, having been sidelined by serious hamstring problems for around nine months.

Powell was included in United's Champions League squad for their crucial group game against VfL Wolfsburg on 9 December 2015, due to a number of injuries. He came on as a replacement for Juan Mata in this game which United went on to lose 3–2. PSV knocked Manchester United out of the Champions League, defeating CSKA Moscow in the other Group B match. He also came on as a second-half substitute in United's next game, a league defeat at Bournemouth, his first league appearance for United in over three years.

On transfer deadline day, 1 February 2016, Powell moved to Hull City on loan until the end of the 2015–16 season. He made his debut on 20 February 2016 in the FA Cup fifth round match at the Emirates Stadium against Arsenal that ended in a 0–0 draw.

In June 2016, Powell was released by Manchester United, and in July 2016 was variously reported to be set to sign for Wolverhampton Wanderers.

Wigan Athletic
On 12 July 2016, Powell returned to Wigan Athletic on a free transfer, signing a three-year contract. On 13 August 2016, Powell scored in his first appearance of the season, in a 3–0 home win against Blackburn Rovers. His first season was seemingly ended prematurely by injury during a January 2017 FA Cup game against Nottingham Forest, but Powell returned to first-team action three months later, coming on as a substitute and scoring an injury-time winner against Rotherham United. On 13 April 2017, Powell scored an 11-minute hat-trick for Wigan, who were 2–0 down in the second half against Barnsley, earning his side a 3–2 home win. Powell continued his scoring momentum four days later, netting from the bench in Wigan's 2–1 away defeat to Brighton & Hove Albion on 17 April 2017. Despite scoring five goals in three consecutive substitute appearances, Powell's exploits weren't enough to help Wigan avoid relegation to EFL League One.

Powell opened his account for the 2017–18 campaign on 5 August 2017, scoring from close range in Wigan's 1–0 opening day victory at Milton Keynes Dons. Powell claimed a second-half brace the following week, scoring a header and converting a penalty as Wigan cruised to a 4–1 home win against Bury. Powell scored 15 goals during the season helping the Latics win the League One title. In April 2018 he was nominated for the EFL League One Player of the Season award but he missed out to Blackburn Rovers' Bradley Dack.

Powell began the 2018–19 season well scoring in the first three matches against Aston Villa, Nottingham Forest and Sheffield Wednesday. Powell scored eight goals in 32 matches as Wigan secured Championship survival, finishing in 18th position. Wigan manager Paul Cook revealed in June 2019 that Powell had turned down the offer of a new contract and instead agreed one with Stoke City.

Stoke City
On 25 June 2019, Powell joined Championship side Stoke City. Powell made his debut on the opening day of the 2019–20 season against Queens Park Rangers but was unable to finish the match due to injury. He didn't return to the side until the end of the September against Nottingham Forest by which time Stoke had failed to register a victory and were bottom of the table. Michael O'Neill was appointed Stoke manager in November and Powell became a key member of his team as Stoke's results began to improve and the team move away from the foot of the table. He scored his first goal for the club on 1 January 2020 in a 5–2 victory against Huddersfield Town. Powell scored twice in a 5–1 win against relegation rivals Hull City on 7 March 2020 just before the season was suspended due to the COVID-19 pandemic. The season returned in June and Powell scored a 93rd-minute equaliser in the first match of the restart away at Reading. He came in for criticism in the next match against Middlesbrough after picking up two yellow cards within a minute. Powell ended the campaign with five goals from 30 appearances as Stoke avoided relegation and finished in 15th position.

The continuing COVID-19 pandemic meant all of Stoke City's 2020–21 matches were played behind closed doors, but Powell enjoyed a productive year, making 42 league and cup appearances, top-scoring with 12 Championship goals while also making three assists. In May 2021, he won the club's end-of-season Player of the Year award with almost 60% of the votes. He started the 2021–22 with six goals in 10 first team appearances before suffering a fibula injury ruling him out for eight weeks. In March 2022, after a somewhat lacklustre return to the first team, Powell was sidelined for another six weeks with a new quad muscle injury. He returned for the final two matches of the season as Stoke finished in 14th. At the end of the season Powell signed a one-year contract extension.

International career
Powell has represented England at under-16, under-17, under-18, under-19 and under-21 levels. On 5 November 2009, he made his debut for the under-16 team in a 2–0 win against Northern Ireland. On 25 August 2010, Powell made his debut against Turkey for the under-17 side. On 28 August 2010, Powell scored a free-kick for the under-17s in a 4–0 win against Australia in the FA Men's under-17 International Tournament. He played in the 2011 UEFA European U-17 Football Championship, with England making it to the semi-final and Powell scoring against France in the group stage. Powell made his under-18 debut in a 3–0 win against Poland on 7 March 2012 at Crewe's Alexandra Stadium. He scored on his under-19 debut against Germany on 6 September 2012. He was called up to the under-21 squad for the first time on 3 October 2012, for the play-off games against Serbia. He made his debut on 13 November, playing the full 90 minutes of a 2–0 win against Northern Ireland at Bloomfield Road.

Career statistics

Honours
Wigan Athletic
EFL League One: 2017–18

Individual
PFA Team of the Year: 2017–18 League One
Stoke City Player of the Year: 2021

References

External links

Nick Powell at The Football Association
Nick Powell profile at Sky Sports
Nick Powell profile at BBC Sport

1994 births
Living people
Sportspeople from Crewe
English footballers
England youth international footballers
England under-21 international footballers
Association football midfielders
Crewe Alexandra F.C. players
Manchester United F.C. players
Wigan Athletic F.C. players
Leicester City F.C. players
Hull City A.F.C. players
Stoke City F.C. players
English Football League players
Premier League players